The culture of Ukraine is the composite of the material and spiritual values of the Ukrainian people that has formed throughout the history of Ukraine. It is closely intertwined with ethnic studies about ethnic Ukrainians and Ukrainian historiography which is focused on the history of Kyiv and the region around it.

History

Although the country has often struggled to preserve its independence its people have managed to retain their cultural possessions and are proud of the considerable cultural legacy they have created. Numerous writers have contributed to the country's literary history such as Ivan Kotliarevsky, Taras Shevchenko and Ivan Franko. The Ukrainian culture has experienced a significant resurgence since the establishment of independence in 1991.

The earliest evidence of cultural artefacts in the Ukrainian lands can be traced to decorated mammoth tusks in the Neanderthal era. Later, the nomadic tribes of the southern lands of the 4th century BCE, like the Scythians, produced finely worked gold ornaments such as the pectoral found in the Tovsta Mohyla mound.

The modern Ukrainian culture is believed to be formed as a descendant of the ancient state of Kyivan Rus' centered in Kyiv as well the Kingdom of Galicia–Volhynia, both of which Ukrainians claim as their historical ancestors. Therefore, it has a shared culture and history with neighbouring nations, such as Belarusians and Russians. Ukrainian historian, academic and politician of the Ukrainian People's Republic, Mykhailo Hrushevsky referred to Ukraine as Ukraine-Rus, emphasising Ukraine's historical claim to the ancient state of Kievan Rus.

Traditional peasant folk art, embroidery and vernacular architecture are critical to Ukrainian culture, and its elements have often been determined by the resources available at the time. The country's strong tradition of folk art and embroidery continues to this day, with Ukrainian embroidery often considered an art form in itself.

Ukrainian customs are heavily influenced by the Ukrainian Greek Catholicism, Ruthenian Greek Catholicism and Eastern Orthodox Church and traditions from Slavic mythology. 
Prior to the Soviet Union, the Ukrainian culture has had heavy influence from other East Slavic cultures such as Russian and Belarusian culture.

Ukrainian culture has had to overcome numerous obstacles in order to survive and retain its originality, since foreign powers and empires who dominated the country and its people in the past often implemented policies aimed at assimilating the Ukrainian population into their own population, as well as trying to eradicate and purge elements of the culture. For example, the policy of Russification posed significant obstacles to the development of the culture.

Whilst progressing into modernity, Ukraine remains a highly traditional country, where the observance of certain customs and practices play a central role in its culture. Many significant Ukrainian holidays and events are based on the old Julian Calendar and so differ from their Gregorian counterparts. These include Christmas and New Year's Eve, both of which are highly important in Ukrainian culture.

Customs

Holidays and celebrations 

 
Social gatherings like Vechornytsi have a long history in Ukrainian culture, and so do traditional holidays like Ivan Kupala Day, Maslenitsa, Koledowanie, and Malanka, where people gather in large groups. "Razom nas bahato, nas ne podolaty" is a popular cultural and political statement of both traditional and modern Ukrainians. It translates as "Together we are many! We cannot be defeated!"

Weddings

Traditional Ukrainian wedding celebrations have many rituals that involve music and dancing, drinking and eating, and crowds of people. The wedding consists of three separate parts that can last for days or even weeks. First there is a betrothal, then a ceremony, followed by a big celebration. The betrothal involves the groom going to the bride's parents to bargain for the dowry he will pay for the bride and to seek the blessing of her parents. There are many stories in Ukrainian folklore of a bride being stolen without the groom paying ransom. Often, the stolen bride is a willing participant and the couple elopes without her parents' permission. Alternatively, the bride can refuse an offer of marriage, in which case, it is customary for the parents to meet the groom at the door with a pumpkin to convey the message, if a pumpkin is given then the bridegroom can find one of the friends of the bride to see who is interested and begin the courtship process again if he finds one of the friends of the girlfriend is interested if the parents of the girlfriend gave a pumpkin, (this is specifically a Ukrainian traditional custom), the parents they usually ask for a moment before giving a final reply to see if the daughter is interested in private without the boyfriend being present while he is waiting in the guestroom. living room for the reply, if the girlfriend is not interested or if the parents find the man unsuitable for their daughter, then the father comes forward and gives a pumpkin, but even though a pumpkin is not the end of the world, for the boyfriend means the end of a relationship and that means that one of the friends of the bride he can show his interest, in that case and see if one of them is interested in him then they begin the relationship, still nowadays the tradition is the relationship ideally between the courtship process all the way to marriage should no longer than two years.

Unlike the West where people can question the parents, in Ukrainian culture if the boyfriend is given a pumpkin he cannot ask why he was declined. some parents might give the answer some might not. However, that means that the groom he has to respect it and move on. In Ukrainian culture as well as most Slavic and Eastern cultures it is considered very rude for someone younger, even if they are not part of the same family, to question parents.

Once the young man and young woman reach an agreement and the parents fully consent and give the blessing, the official wedding takes place in a church, often in a group ceremony with other couples each one carries a wedding icon the lady carries the Theotokos and the man carries the icon of Our Lord (both icons need to be previously blessed by a priest) once this happens the couple holds the icon as the parents give the blessing to them with another traditional custom. A celebration follows at home with the entire community participating.

Education

Language

The main language is Ukrainian. However, most of the Ukrainian citizens also speak Russian.

Religion

Religion is practiced throughout the country. Eastern Orthodox Christianity and Eastern Catholicism and Roman Catholicism are the three most widely practiced religions. The Ukrainian Orthodox Church is the largest in the country. Faithful of the Ukrainian Greek Catholic Church, the second largest, practice Byzantine rites, but are in communion with the Roman Catholic Church which means that they are also fully Catholic.

Cuisine

Food is an important part to the Ukrainian culture. Special foods are used at Easter, as well as Christmas. During Christmas, for example, people prepare kutia, which is a mixture of cooked wheat groats, poppy seeds, honey, and special sweet breads.

An average Ukrainian diet consists of fish, cheese, and a variety of sausages. Head cheese is also quite popular in Ukraine, as well as Kolbasa, a type of sausage. Typically bread is a core part of every meal, and must be included for the meal to be "complete". During Christmas, for example, it is the tradition to have a twelve-course meal. Included at Easter are the famous pysanky, which are colored and patterned eggs. Making these eggs is a long process, and they are used for display at the center of the table rather than consumed.

Ukrainians often toast to good health, linger over their meal, and engage in lively conversation with family and friends. Often they will drink tea (chai), wine, or coffee afterwards with a simple dessert, such as a fruit pastry. Popular foods include salo, borscht, chicken Kiev, pierogi, and pilaf.

Art

Architecture 

Ukrainian architecture reflects distinct features of that particular location and time period. Design and architecture are influenced by the existing political and economic climate.

Vernacular architecture
Different regions in Ukraine have their own distinctive style of vernacular architecture, based on local traditions and the knowledge handed down through generations. The Museum of Folk Architecture and Way of Life of Central Naddnipryanshchyna is located in Pereiaslav. The open-air museum contains 13 theme museums, 122 examples of national architecture, and over 30,000 historical cultural objects. The Museum of Decorative Finishes is one of the featured museums that preserves the handiwork of decorative architectural applications in Ukrainian architecture. Decorative finishes use ancient traditional design patterns.

Ornamental and visual art

On special occasions, every aspect of ordinary life is transformed into ornamental art form of artistic expression. Ornamentation and design motifs are steeped in symbolism, religious ritual and meaning. From the illuminated manuscripts of the Peresopnytsia Gospel to the famous pysanky and vytynanky, intricate details have ancient meaning. Much of the oral history was lost during the past 300 years of Russification of Ukraine when Ukrainian culture and language were forbidden. Organizations like the Ivan Honchar Museum, Pysanka Museum and the Ukrainian Museum are dedicated to historic preservation. Different regions of Ukraine have their own traditional ornamentation with their own variation of style and meaning. Examples can be seen in Petrykivka Painting, ornamental architecture, Ukrainian embroidery, and textile motifs from various Ukrainian historical regions. Some of these works are inscribed by UNESCO as part of the Intangible Cultural Heritage of Ukraine.

Jewelry

Painting

Traditional costume
The iconic embroidered shirt or blouse, the vyshyvanka, is the most recognizable part of Ukrainian national costume, and even has its own public celebration in May. For men, traditional dress also includes kozhukh, kontusz, żupan and sharovary. For women, traditional dress includes kozhushanka, ochipok for married women, and Ukrainian wreath for unmarried girls. Garments are made using elaborate structural design, complicated weaving techniques, extensive embroidery, and cutwork needlework.

Weaving and embroidery
Artisan textile arts play an important role in Ukrainian culture, especially in Ukrainian wedding traditions. Ukrainian embroidery, weaving, and lace-making are used in traditional folk dress and in traditional celebrations. Ukrainian embroidery varies depending on the region of origin, and the designs have a long history of motifs, compositions, choice of colors, and types of stitches. Use of color is very important and has roots in Ukrainian folklore. Embroidery motifs found in different parts of Ukraine are preserved in the Rushnyk Museum in Pereiaslav.

National dress is woven and highly decorated. Weaving with handmade looms is still practiced in the village of Krupove, situated in Rivne Oblast. The village is the birthplace of two famous personalities in the scene of national crafts fabrication. Nina Myhailivna and Uliana Petrivna with international recognition. In order to preserve this traditional knowledge, the village is planning to open a local weaving center, museum, and weaving school.

Performance art

Dance

Traditional dances are popular within Ukraine, many of which derive from rural Cossack villages. One Ukrainian style of dancing is called the kalyna. Both men and women participate in this type of dancing.
 The women wear colourful costumes, sometimes featuring a solid-coloured (usually blue, green, red, or black) tunic and matching apron, and under that an open skirt, and below that a white skirt with an embroidered hem that should reach an inch or so below the knee. If they wear a tunic, then under that they wear a long-sleeved richly embroidered white shirt. Traditionally, women wear a type of red leather boots to dance in. They also wear a flower head piece (vinok), that is a headband covered with flowers and has long flowing ribbons down the back that flow when they dance, and plain red coral necklaces.
 The men wear baggy trousers (usually blue, white, black or red) and a shirt (usually white, but sometimes black) embroidered at the neck and down the stomach. Over the shirt they sometimes will wear a richly embroidered vest. Around their waist they wear a thick sash with fringed ends. Like the women, they wear boots, but these can be black or white in addition to red.
 Kalyna dancing involves partner dancing. One dance, called the pryvitannya, is a greeting dance. It is slow and respectful, the women bow to the audience and present bread with salt on a cloth and flowers. Another, called the hopak is much more lively, and involves many fast-paced movements. Hence hopak as a dance is derived from hopak martial art of Cossacks.

Music

Theatre

Museums and libraries

There are nearly 5,000 different museums in Ukraine, including National Art Museum of Ukraine, National Historical Museum of Ukraine, Museum of Western and Oriental Art, Ukrainian National Chernobyl Museum in Kyiv, Lviv National Art Gallery, Poltava Art Museum, Simferopol Art Museum, and many others of art, history, traditions or dedicated to different issues. Many of these museums are at risk due to the 2022 Russian invasion of Ukraine.

There are 14 libraries of state significance (Vernadsky National Library of Ukraine, National Parliamentary Library of Ukraine, National historical library of Ukraine in Kyiv, Korolenko State Scientific Library in Kharkiv, and others), and 45,000 public libraries all over Ukraine. All these institutions own 700 million books.

Literature

Ukrainian literature had a difficult development because, due to constant foreign domination over Ukrainian territories, there was often a significant difference between the spoken and written language. At times the use of the Ukrainian language was even partly prohibited to be printed. However, foreign rule by Lithuania, Poland, Romania, Russia, Austria-Hungary, and the Ottoman Turkey, left behind new words thereby enriching Ukrainian. Despite tsarist and Soviet repression, Ukrainian authors were able to produce a rich literary heritage.

Many Ukrainians also contributed to the closely related literature in Russian language.

Popular culture

Cinema

Mass media

Sports

Ukraine greatly benefitted from the Soviet emphasis on physical education, which left Ukraine with hundreds of stadiums, swimming pools, gymnasiums, and many other athletic facilities.

Football is the most popular sport in Ukraine. The top professional league is the Vyscha Liha, also known as the Ukrainian Premier League. The two most successful teams in the Vyscha Liha are rivals FC Dynamo Kyiv and FC Shakhtar Donetsk. Although Shakhtar is the reigning champion of the Vyscha Liha, Dynamo Kyiv has been much more successful historically, winning the UEFA Cup Winners' Cup two times, the UEFA Super Cup once, the USSR Championship a record 13 times, and the Ukrainian Championship a record 12 times; while Shakhtar only won four Ukrainian Championships and one and last UEFA Cup.

Many Ukrainians also played for the USSR national football team, most notably Igor Belanov and Oleg Blokhin, winners of the prestigious Golden Ball Award for the best footballers of the year. This award was only presented to one Ukrainian after the collapse of the Soviet Union, Andriy Shevchenko, the former captain of the Ukraine national football team. The national team made its debut in the 2006 FIFA World Cup, and reached the quarter-finals before losing to eventual champions, Italy.

Ukrainian brothers Vitaliy Klychko and Volodymyr Klychko have held world heavyweight champion titles in boxing.

Ukraine made its debut at the 1994 Winter Olympics. So far, Ukraine has been much more successful in the Summer Olympics (96 medals in four appearances) than in the Winter Olympics (Five medals in four appearances). Ukraine is currently ranked 35th by the number of gold medals won in the All-time Olympic Games medal count, with every country above it, except for Russia, having more appearances.

Other popular sports in Ukraine include handball, tennis, rugby union, basketball, gymnastics, and ice hockey.

Tourism

Ukraine attracts more than 20 million visitors a year from around the world. Seven Natural Wonders of Ukraine and Seven Wonders of Ukraine are popular destinations as well as modern urban cities, festivals, ecotourism, and medical tourism.

See also

 List of museums in Ukraine
 List of places named after people (Ukraine)
 List of UNESCO World Heritage Sites in Ukraine
 Intangible Cultural Heritage of Ukraine
 Russification of Ukraine
 The Seven Wonders of Ukraine are the seven historical and cultural monuments of Ukraine
 Ukrainian historical regions
 Arts of Ukraine

References

Print sources

 Dubrovskiy Visnyk. November 2007. "...I ne pereshkoda letu lita"
 

 
Ukrainian studies
Slavic culture
European culture